This is a list of English words of Romanian origin.

ban – a noble title. Probably originally from Thracian *ban via Romanian ban
hora  – a type of circle dance originating in the Balkans but also found in other countries. Its English etymology includes Hebrew, Romanian and Turkish.
mineriad – term used to name violent interventions of miners
Palatschinke  – a thin crêpe-like variety of pancake common in Central and Eastern Europe. From Latin placenta (cake) via Romanian plăcintă (cake) and Hungarian palacsinta Its English etymology
pastrami – A seasoned smoked cut of beef. This is traditionally made from a navel cut.
 Dracula - The most famous vampire of literature
 Brânză - is a type of dairy product. (Brânză de burduf, Brânză de vaci, Brânză de coșuleț, Telemea)

See also
Lists of English words of international origin

Romanian origin, List of English words of